Phil McGuire (born 25 August 1970) is a British former field hockey player who competed in the 1996 Summer Olympics.

References

External links
 

1970 births
Living people
British male field hockey players
Olympic field hockey players of Great Britain
Field hockey players at the 1996 Summer Olympics
Teddington Hockey Club players